Samri is a folkloric music and dance originated in Saudi Arabia . It involves singing poetry while the daff drum is being played often while two rows of men, seated on the knees, sway and clap to the rhythm.

External links
 Video of Samri performed at wedding in Saudi Arabia
 Saudi Folk Music: Alive and Well

Middle Eastern dances
Arab culture
Arabic music
Saudi Arabian music